The Scoundrel (German: Das Ekel) is a comedy play by the German writers Hans Reimann and Toni Impekoven. It was adapted into three films: The Scoundrel (1931), The Scoundrel (1939) and The Domestic Tyrant (1959). Two television adaptations have also been made.

References

German plays adapted into films
Plays set in Germany
1924 plays
Comedy plays